XHGEM-FM is a radio station in Metepec on 91.7 MHz, owned by the government of the State of Mexico. It is part of the Radio Mexiquense state radio network and is its flagship on FM, broadcasting to the state capital of Toluca. It signed on air in 2002, joining AM station XEGEM-AM 1600. 1600 AM and 91.7 FM have separate program schedules.

References

Radio stations established in 2002
Radio stations in the State of Mexico
Public radio in Mexico